GAGAGA is the debut single of the Japanese Idol Group SDN48. It was Released on 2010.11.24 and had participation of all the members from the 1st and 2nd generations.

CD
1. GAGAGA (Senbatsu: 1st Generation: Akita Kazue, Ito Kana, Umeda Haruka, Urano Kazumi, Ohori Megumi, Kato Mami, Kohara Haruka, Sato Yukari, Serina, Noro Kayo, Chen Qu. 2nd Generation: KONAN) 
2. Kodoku na Runner (孤独なランナー) (SDN48 qst and 2nd generations, 39 members)
3A. (Type-A Exclusive Track) Eros no Trigger (Undergirls A: 1st Generation: Okochi Misa, Imayoshi Megumi, Kaida Juri, Hatakeyama Chisaki, Mitsui Hiromi, Nachu, Nishikunihara Reiko. 2nd Generation: Oyama Aimi, Kimoto Yuki, Fujikoso Yumi, Natsuko, Matsushima Rumi.)
3b. (Type-B Exclusive Track) Sado e Wataru (Undergirls B: 1st generation: Kondo Sayaka, Kouchi Masami, Tezuka Machiko. 2nd generation: Aikawa Yuki, Akiko, Ito Mana, Takahashi Yui, Tanisaki Tomomi, Tsuda Marina, Fukuda Akane, Hosoda Miyuu, Ninomiya Yuka.)
4. GAGAGA (off vocal)
5. Kodoku na Runner (off vocal)
6a. (Type-A Exclusive Track) Eros no Trigger (off vocal)
6b. (Type-B Exclusive Track) Sado e Wataru (off vocal)

DVD
GAGAGA (Music Video)

Kodoku na Runner (Music Video)

(Type-A Exclusive Track) Eros no Trigger (Music Video)

(Type-A Exclusive Track) Yuuwaku no Garter (Oshima Yuko · Kojima Haruna · Shinoda Mariko from AKB48) Special ver. (LIVE at YOKOHAMA ARENA)

(Type-A Exclusive Track) SDN48 CD Debut Congratulations Video from AKB48 Members (Part 1/2)

(Type-B Exclusive Track) Recording & Music Clip Making

(Type-B Exclusive Track) Sado e Wataru (Music Video)

(Type-B Exclusive Track) SDN48 CD Debut Congratulations Video from AKB48 Members (Part 2/2)

Sales
First Week: 63,627 copies (#1st on release date and #3rd Week Rank)
GAGAGA sold 71,714 copies in 2010, and was the #99th most sold single on Japan in that year

Trivia
The Selection of members singing "GAGAGA" was chosen by fans votes online. The rank was: #1 Megumi Ohori, #2 Yukari Sato, #3 Kayo Noro, #4 KONAN, #5 Kazumi Urano, #6 Haruka Umeda, #7 Serina, #8 Mami Kato, #9 Haruka Kohara, #10 Ito Kana, #11 Akita Kazue, #12 Fukuyama Sakura. However, Fukuyama Sakura left the group and Chen Qu replaced her on the performance.
The single was also released in Korean Lyrics.

References 

2010 singles
2010 songs
Song articles with missing songwriters